Chapin is a village in Morgan County, Illinois, United States.  The population was 512 at the 2010 census. It is part of the Jacksonville Micropolitan Statistical Area.

History
Chapin was named for its founders, Charles and Horace Chapin.

Geography

Demographics

As of the census of 2000, there were 592 people, 227 households, and 168 families residing in the village. The racial makeup of the village was 99.16% White, 0.17% Native American, and 0.68% from two or more races.

There were 227 households, out of which 37.0% had children under the age of 18 living with them, 60.8% were married couples living together, 9.7% had a female householder with no husband present, and 25.6% were non-families. 23.3% of all households were made up of individuals, and 11.9% had someone living alone who was 65 years of age or older. The average household size was 2.61 and the average family size was 3.06.

In the village, the population was spread out, with 29.2% under the age of 18, 6.1% from 18 to 24, 28.0% from 25 to 44, 23.8% from 45 to 64, and 12.8% who were 65 years of age or older. The median age was 37 years. For every 100 females, there were 107.7 males. For every 100 females age 18 and over, there were 95.8 males.

The median income for a household in the village was $42,143, and the median income for a family was $43,482. Males had a median income of $28,906 versus $26,607 for females. The per capita income for the village was $16,972. About 8.2% of families and 8.9% of the population were below the poverty line, including 9.4% of those under age 18 and 14.3% of those age 65 or over.

References

External links
 Village of Chapin Website

Villages in Morgan County, Illinois
Villages in Illinois
Jacksonville, Illinois micropolitan area